Furcinetechma sangaycola is a species of moth of the family Tortricidae. It is found in Pichincha Province, Ecuador.

The wingspan is 17.5 mm. The ground colour of the forewings is whitish, suffused with cream basally and terminally where blackish brown dots are present. The markings are blackish brown with some paler parts. The hindwings are whitish, but cream at the apex.

Etymology
The species name refers to the large bifurcation of the uncus and is derived from Latin magnus (meaning large) and furca (meaning fork).

References

Moths described in 2008
Euliini
Moths of South America
Taxa named by Józef Razowski